Uekusa (written: 植草) is a Japanese surname. Notable people with the surname include:

, Japanese karateka
, Japanese economist
, Japanese footballer
, Japanese entertainer

See also
Uekusa University, a university in Chiba, Chiba Prefecture Japan
Uekusa Gakuen Junior College, a junior college in Chiba, Chiba Prefecture Japan

Japanese-language surnames